The following is a list of people who have attained the rank of General within the Namibian Army (NA).

Key

The ranks of General Officers changed in when the rank previously called Brigadier became known as Brigadier General.

References

Namibian military leaders
Namibian
Military of Namibia